Ramón Eduardo Arriaga Tabares (born June 15, 1990 in Zapopan, Jalisco), known as Ramón Arriaga, is a professional Mexican association football (soccer) player who currently plays for Reynosa F.C.

References

External links
 

Atlético Reynosa footballers
1990 births
Living people
Mexican footballers
People from Zapopan, Jalisco
Liga MX players
Association football midfielders